Omphale was a legendary queen of Lydia in Greek mythology.

Omphale may also refer to:

 Omphale (Gérôme sculpture), a sculpture of the queen by Jean-Léon Gérôme.
 Omphale (horse) (1781–1799), a British Thoroughbred racehorse and broodmare.
 Omphale (wasp), a genus of hymenoptera of the family Eulophidae.
 Daedalium, an ancient city of Sicily, which was also known as Omphale.